was a town located in Chikujō District, Fukuoka Prefecture. In March 1935, the town merged with the town of Hachiya and dissolved. The town is now part of the city of Buzen.

History 
 1889 - Due to the municipal status enforcement, the town of Unoshima was formed within Kōge District.
 1896 - Tsuiki and Kōge Districts merged to form Chikujō District.
 1935 - Merged with the town of Hachiya to form the town of Hachiya. The town of Unoshima dissolves.
 1955 - The town of Hachiya and 8 villages merged to form the city of Unoshima. 4 days later, it was renamed to the city of Buzen.

See also 
 List of dissolved municipalities of Japan
 Hachiya, Fukuoka
 Buzen, Fukuoka

Dissolved municipalities of Fukuoka Prefecture
Populated places disestablished in 1935